Andrew Ranger (born November 20, 1986) is a Canadian professional racing driver who competes full-time in the NASCAR Pinty's Series, driving the No. 27 for Paillé Course//Racing. Ranger is a veteran of the Pinty's Series, having claimed 28 wins in 133 races. He was champion in 2007, 2009 and 2019, runner-up in 2016, third in 2012 and 2015, and fourth in 2008.

Racing career

Champ Car

Ranger was the 2002 Canadian Formula A Karting champion and 2003 North American Fran Am 2000 Pro Champion. He raced in the Toyota Atlantic series in 2004 with number 27, the same as Quebec racecar drivers Gilles Villeneuve and Jacques Villeneuve, scoring six podiums (top 3 finishes) and winning the Rookie of the Year award.

Ranger made his debut in the Champ Car World Series in 2005 with Conquest Racing, also driving the No. 27 car. He became the youngest driver in the series' history to finish on the podium with a second place at Monterrey. After a few solid finishes at the beginning of the season, Ranger's year went downhill as he mostly struggled in the second half of the season, but held on to 10th in the points championship.

In 2006, he remained with the Conquest Racing team. He ranked 10th in the standings with a best finish of 5th at the 2006 Lexmark Indy 300.

NASCAR
With no sponsorship and Champ Car merging with the Indy Racing League, Andrew Ranger moved to stock car racing in the NASCAR Canadian Tire Series to drive the No. 27 Ford for Dave Jacombs. He won the second race in the series at Mosport International Raceway, and the season points championship. He has also won at  Montreal and Trois-Rivières during 2008. He has four poles to go along with his wins at, Mosport Int'l Raceway, Edmonton (2007); Edmonton (2008).

In 2009, he was the class of the field for the NASCAR Canadian Tire Series, winning the Dickies 200 at Mosport International Raceway, the A&W 300 at SunValley Speedway (his first ever oval), The Rexall Edmonton Indy, Vortex Brake Pads 200 at Mosport International Raceway, the GP3R 300 at Circuit Trois-Rivières and the Komatsu 300 At Riverside Speedway. On top of all of this he has 2 poles and many podium finishes. Ranger ended up winning the title by 167 points for his 2nd Championship in 3 years.

He drove for Fitz Motorsports at the August 2008 NASCAR Nationwide Series race at Circuit Gilles Villeneuve in Montreal and he also drove for the team in four of the remaining 10 races of 2008 with a best finish of 19th at Bristol Motor Speedway. In 2009, he drove the No. 11 Tide/Ridemakerz.com /Toyota Camry to a 3rd-place finish after leading many laps in the 2009 Napa Auto Parts 200 at Circuit Gilles Villeneuve. For 2010 he will drive for the No. 27 Baker-Curb Racing Nationwide team with sponsorship from Dodge including Montreal.

For 2010, Ranger drove part-time at the NASCAR Canadian Tire Series with the No. 27 Dave Jacombs Dodge. He ran some races for NDS Motorsports in their No. 35 Waste Management Chevy in the NASCAR K&N Pro Series East and West series. He won the race at Infineon Raceway in the K&N Pro Series West on June 20. He picked up the win from pole in Lime Rock Park in the K&N Pro Series East series. On July 17, he won from the pole at the Toronto Indy 100, being the first driver to win all 3 NASCAR regional touring series in one year. His 3rd win of the year was at Trois-Rivières and at Circuit Gilles Villeneuve where he bumped Jason Bowles in the last turn for the win both times from the pole. In 2011 he again won at Montreal and Toronto on a limited basis schedule.

Ranger raced in the K&N Pro Series and the NASCAR Canadian Tire Series again in 2011. On May 22, 2011, Ranger won the ARCA race on the road course at New Jersey Motorsports Park in Millville, New Jersey. On June 25, 2011, Andrew competed in the NASCAR Nationwide Series race at Road America finishing sixth. Ranger made his Sprint Cup Series debut at Watkins Glen finishing 35th for FAS Lane Racing.

For 2012, Ranger ran in the NASCAR Canadian Tire Series and Nationwide Series for GC Motorsports. He won two Canadian Tire events in his home province of Quebec at Circuit Gilles Villeneuve and Circuit ICAR along with the ARCA event at New Jersey Motorsports Park.

In 2013, Ranger ran a partial schedule in the Canadian Tire Series. He also ran the road courses in the NASCAR Nationwide Series and in the ARCA Racing Series. He won at New Jersey Motorsports Park in the ARCA Racing Series for the third year in a row.

In 2014, Ranger left Dave Jacombs's team and joined D. J. Kennington's DJK Racing to drive the No. 27 Dodge. He would remain with the team through 2019. Ranger did not participate in the abbreviated 2020 Pinty's Series season held during the COVID-19 pandemic. He returned to the series in 2021 driving for Rick Ware Racing's new Pinty's Series team. The team also gave him one race in their Xfinity (previously Nationwide) Series No. 17 car, which they field jointly with SS-Green Light Racing. He wanted to compete, but was replaced by J. J. Yeley.

Motorsports career results

American open-wheel racing results
(key)

Atlantic Championship

Champ Car

NASCAR
(key) (Bold - Pole position awarded by time. Italics - Pole position earned by points standings. * – Most laps led.)

Sprint Cup Series

Nationwide Series

Camping World Truck Series

K&N Pro Series East

K&N Pro Series West

Pinty's Series

 Qualified but replaced by Larry Jackson 
 Season still in progress 
 Ineligible for series points

CASCAR

Castrol Super Series

ARCA Racing Series
(key) (Bold – Pole position awarded by qualifying time. Italics – Pole position earned by points standings or practice time. * – Most laps led.)

See also
 List of Canadians in Champ Car
 List of Canadians in NASCAR

References

External links

 

Living people
1986 births
People from Montérégie
Racing drivers from Quebec
24 Hours of Daytona drivers
NASCAR drivers
ARCA Menards Series drivers
Champ Car drivers
Atlantic Championship drivers
North American Formula Renault drivers
British Formula Renault 2.0 drivers
Manor Motorsport drivers
Conquest Racing drivers